Charles James Hoar (28 July 1862 – 25 June 1913) was an English cricketer.  Hoar was a right-handed batsman, though his bowling style is unknown.  He was born at Witley, Surrey.

Hoar made a single first-class appearance for Sussex against Hampshire at the County Ground, Southampton in 1885.  In Sussex's first-innings he ended unbeaten on 4.  In Sussex's second innings, he was dismissed for 8 runs by William Dible, with Hampshire winning by 101 runs.  This was his only major appearance for Sussex.

He died at Ash Vale, Surrey on 25 June 1913.

References

External links
Charles Hoar at ESPNcricinfo
Charles Hoar at CricketArchive

1862 births
1913 deaths
People from the Borough of Waverley
English cricketers
Sussex cricketers